Fire and Blood is a double-DVD from American heavy metal band Manowar. The first DVD is a documentary that features part 2 of the series "Hell on Earth". With almost two hours of running time "Hell on Earth Part 2" documents the 1998 "Hell on Stage" European Tour with almost 30 shows. The second DVD, Blood in Brazil is their live performance at the Philips Monsters Of Rock in São Paulo, Brazil on September 26, 1998. This was the first a complete concert performance captured in the band's career.

Blood in Brazil track listing 
 Intro 
 Manowar 
 Metal Daze 
 Blood Of My Enemies 
 Kill With Power 
 Sign Of The Hammer 
 Gates Of Valhalla 
 Sting Of The Bumblebee 
 The Gods Made Heavy Metal 
 Metal Warriors 
  Kings Of Metal 
 The Power 
 Hail And Kill 
 Black Wind, Fire And Steel 
 The Crown And The Ring (Lament Of The Kings)

Hell On Earth Part II chapter 
 This Is Heavy Metal
 Blood Of The Kings
 France
 Voulez Vous
 Belgium
 Bridge Of Death
 Switzerland
 Guyana (Cult Of The Damned)
 Germany Part I
 Hatred
 Germany Part II
 March For Revenge (By The Soldiers Of Death)
 Germany Part III
 The Gods Made Heavy Metal
 Czech Republic
 Army Of The Immortals
 Austria
 Hungary
 Master Of The Wind
 Portugal
 Dark Avenger
 Spain
 Battle Hymn
 The Crown And The Ring (Lament Of The Kings)

References

External links
 Manowar's Official Website

Manowar albums
2002 video albums
2002 live albums
Live video albums
Albums with cover art by Ken Kelly (artist)